Thindiomyces is a genus of fungi in the family Helotiaceae. This is a monotypic genus, containing the single species Thindiomyces epiphyllus.

References

Helotiaceae
Monotypic Ascomycota genera